Karin Sonja Charlotta Karlsbro (born 23 September 1970) is a Swedish politician of the Liberals.

Education
Karlsbro protested against France's atomic bomb tests on the islands of the South Pacific in her youth. She holds a law degree from Stockholm University and has studied at the London School of Economics and Political Science (LSE).

Career
Karlsbro served as the chairman of the Liberal Youth of Sweden between 1995 and 1997. Between 2000 and 2006, she was the administrative director at the Parliament Office of the Liberal People's Party (now the Liberals).  From 2006 to 2010, she worked as the chief of staff for Nyamko Sabuni, then Sweden's Minister for Integration and Gender Equality.

Karlsbro has held a number of political offices in Stockholm and most recently she has served as the group leader in Norrtälje between 2014 and 2018.

She served a Deputy Cabinet Member of the Riksdag between 29 September 2014 until 3 October 2014 and is the number one Deputy Member for the Liberals. Since Februari 2012 she has been the president for the network Green Liberals.

In her professional life, Karlsbro has worked as a consultant in her own company and as a sustainability expert at the PR firm Grayling and is since September 2015 Chief Sustainability Officer at Fastighetsägarna Stockholm.

Member of the European Parliament, 2019–present
On 29 Mars 2019, Karlsbro was named the Liberal's top candidate for the 2019 European Parliament election. She replaced Cecilia Wikström as the first name on the electoral list. 

Since becoming a Member of the European Parliament, Karlsbro has been serving on the Committee on International Trade. In this capacity, she has been working on the EU’s law on deforestation.    

In addition to her committee assignments, Karlsbro is a member of the European Parliament Intergroup on LGBT Rights and the Responsible Business Conduct Working Group.

Personal life
Karlsbro currently lives in Stockholm with her husband Henrik Isakson and their three daughters.

References

External links 

 

Living people
1970 births
Liberals (Sweden) politicians
MEPs for Sweden 2019–2024